Eden TV is an Italian regional television channel of Veneto owned by G.R.2000 srl group. It transmits a light entertainment program: movies, news and weather bulletins, documentary film and sports on LCN 86.

Other channels in the group are Eden 2, Arancio, New Generation Tv and Eden 5.

Programs in Italian 
Tg Treviso
Mercatino
Vie verdi
Hard Trek
Ufo channel
Veneto News
Salute e società
On Race Tv
Adnkronos rotocalco
Epoca che storia
La Tenda Tv
Verde a Nordest
Sport e motori
Video motori
Superpass
Salus TV
Book Generation
Danza Tv
Bouquet Tv
Made in Italy
Coming Soon
newsmagazineweek
Sportwinner
Pianeta oggi Tv
Super Sea
Terra nostra
Vipsciò
Village

Staff
Adriana Rasera (owner)
Rosanna Vettoretti
Daniele Antoniol
Nicola Poloniato

References

External links 
Official Site 
Profile
Profile

Television channels in Italy
Television channels and stations established in 1987
Free-to-air
Italian-language television networks